Otto Reinhold (3 July 1899 – 27 August 1965) was a German composer and music educator

Life 
Born in Thum, Erzgebirge, Reinhold attended the teachers' seminar in Annaberg-Buchholz from 1914 to 1920 and initially became a teacher in Neustädtel. In 1925, he began to teach in Leipzig with Hermann Grabner and to study composition. In 1929, he finished his studies and moved to Dresden, where he worked as a composer and music teacher until the end of his life. His works were especially popular in the German Democratic Republic and were partly recorded on vinyl.

His estate (227 catalogue numbers) is deposited in the music department of the Saxon State and University Library Dresden under the shelf mark: Mus.11705-.

Sound language 
According to Reinhold, he did not feel obliged to any particular style. He composed tonality with Gregorian mode insertion. His works are mostly concise, vital and melodic. He strove for comprehensibility and clear, self-contained form. The neoclassical  tone of some of the works refers to Paul Hindemith in a softened form, which manifests itself particularly in Quartal and quintal harmony and playful intonation. Anton Bruckner also plays a certain role in the themes or treatment of the brass instruments. His Triptychon for orchestra is particularly well known. More modern compositional developments played no role in Reinhold's work.

Reinhold died in Dresden at the age of 66.

Work

Orchestral pieces 
 Symphony (1951)
 triptych (1954)
 Festive Prelude
 Symphonic ballad (1964)
 Dance Suite for piano and orchestra (1953/54)
 Violin Concerto
 flute concert
 Concertante music for flute, viola and orchestra (1963)
 Die Nachtigall, ballet (1958)

Chamber music 
 string quartet (1960)
 Six pieces for string quartet
 piano trio (1948)
 Trio-Serenade for clarinet, viola and piano (1948)
 violin sonata
 Music for viola and piano
 Double Bass Studies with piano
 Piano music in three movements (1938)
 Dresden, piano music (1955)

Further reading 
 Karl Laux (ed.): Das Musikleben in der Deutschen Demokratischen Republik. 1945-1959. Deutscher Verlag für Musik, Leipzig 1963.
 Peter Hollfelder: Die Klaviermusik. Historische Entwicklungen – Komponisten mit Biographien und Werkverzeichnissen – nationale Schulen; das große Standardwerk; mit über 100.000 Einzelwerken und fast 5000 Komponisten. Nikol, Hamburg 1999.
 Werner Felix: unsere neue musik 27: Karl-Rudi Griesbach: Sinfonie (Afrikanische), Otto Reinhold: Konzertante Musik für Flöte, Bratsche und Orchester. Beiheft zur LP Eterna 8 20 742.
 Hansjürgen Schaefer: unsere neue musik 42: Otto Reinhold: Triptychon für Orchester, Paul Kurzbach: Concertino für Klavier und Streicher. Beiheft zur LP Eterna 8 25 892.
 Jens Marggraf: Otto Reinhold – ein vergessener Komponist, in Dresden und die avancierte Musik im 20. Jahrhundert. Part II: 1933-1966, edited by Matthias Herrmann and Hanns-Werner Heister, Laaber 2002,  (Musik in Dresden 5),

References

External links 
 
 

20th-century classical composers
German composers
1899 births
1965 deaths
People from Thum